The 2021 Charlotte 49ers football team represented the University of North Carolina at Charlotte in the 2021 NCAA Division I FBS football season. The 49ers played their home games at Jerry Richardson Stadium in Charlotte, North Carolina, and competed in the East Division of Conference USA (C–USA). They were led by third-year head coach Will Healy.

Previous season
The 49ers finished the 2020 season 2–4, 2–2 in C-USA play to finish in fourth place in the East Division. The 49ers had three games canceled before the start of the season, three games added immediately before or during the season, seven games canceled in total, and six games postponed due to the safety protocols related to the COVID-19 virus.

Coaching staff
On December 29, 2020 offensive line coach Lee Grimes left to take the same position at Kansas. On February 2, Texas co-offensive coordinator and offensive line coach Herb Hand was named to the same position at Charlotte. By February 18, he accepted a position on Gus Malzahn's new staff at UCF. On February 3, wide receivers coach Montario Hardesty joined the South Carolina staff as running backs coach. On February 9, tight ends coach Cody Woodiel returned to the Oregon Ducks as recruiting director. On February 15, South Carolina receivers coach and Charlotte native Joe Cox was named the 49ers' tight ends coach. On February 18 Ridge View High School head coach Perry Parks was brought on to coach wide receivers. On March 3, former NCAA Division II coach of the Year Pete Rossomando came on board to coach offensive line. On June 30, Tyler Hancock joined the staff as special teams coordinator after working as a senior analyst for West Virginia.

Recruiting

Position key

Recruiting class
The following recruits and transfers have signed letters of intent or verbally committed to the Charlotte 49ers football program for the 2021 recruiting year.

Key transfers

Players

Roster

Depth chart

Awards and honors

Preseason

In season

Postseason

All Conference Honorable Mentions:

Offense:
QB – Chris Reynolds, R-Sr. • 
TE – Ryan Carriere, Gr. • 
WR – Grant DuBose, So. •
OL – Ashton Gist, Sr. •
OL – Hunter Kelly, Gr.

Defense:
DE – Markees Watts, R-Sr. • 
LB – Tyler Murray, R-Sr.

Special Teams:
KR – Shadrick Byrd, R-Fr. • 
LS – Cameron Lyons, Gr.

Schedule

Television
Charlotte 49ers home games and conference road games will be broadcast through Conference USA's television partners ESPN, CBS Sports, and Stadium.

Radio
Radio coverage for all games is broadcast by IMG College through the Charlotte 49ers Radio Network flagship station WZGV ESPN Radio 730 AM The Game, and the TuneIn Charlotte 49ers IMG Sports Network app. The radio announcers are "Voice of the 49ers" Matt Swierad with play-by-play alongside NFL veteran Al Wallace providing color commentary and Bobby Rosinski and Walker Mehl with sideline reports.

Preseason media poll

Conference USA released their preseason media poll on July 19, 2021, with the 49ers predicted to finish in fourth place in the East Division.

Game summaries

Duke

Sources:

Following the previous year's drubbing in Durham, the 49ers were looking to regain their pride against the Blue Devils in the first full stadium home game since the 2019 season. The 49ers would score first in the first quarter on a Grant DuBose reception from Chris Reynolds and pad their lead early in the second quarter on a Jonathan Cruz 32 yard field goal. But the Blue Devils would find the endzone midway through the quarter and then take their first lead near the end of the half behind Mataeo Durant's first of three rushing touchdowns to take a 14 to 10 lead into the locker rooms.

Charlotte would regain the lead in the third quarter only to lose it again early in the fourth quarter. With three minutes left Charlotte would again take the lead only to see the Blue Devils again on top of the scoreboard with less than two minutes in regulation. Reynolds would then orchestrate a seven-play drive downfield that resulted in an eleven-yard touchdown pass to Shadrick Byrd with only thirty-three seconds left on the clock. With time expired Duke attempted a hook-and-ladder play, but the 49ers would stop it cold and gain their first victory over a Power 5 and ACC opponent in program history.

Top performances for the game included Charlotte's Chris Reynolds, who threw for 324 yards and three touchdowns. Duke's Mataeo Durant had 29 carries for 255 yards and 3 touchdowns. The 49er's Victor Tucker had 8 receptions for 133 yards. Charlotte's Grant DuBose also had 118 yards receiving with two touchdowns in his 49ers debut.

Game notes:

Charlotte's first victory over a Power 5 conference team and a team from the ACC.
First time the 49ers have hosted a Power 5 conference team.
The win was also Coach Healy's first victory over a Power 5 opponent.
Chris Reynold's is now 39 yards away from breaking Matt Johnson's all-time passing record (5405 yards).
Reynolds is also chasing Johnson's all-time passing touchdowns record, just 3 shy of Johnson's 42 career TDs.
Reynolds was named Conference USA Offensive Player of the Week.
Markees Watts' single sack placed him a half-sack away from Larry Ogunjobi's (13.0) number 2 spot on the 49ers all-time sack record. Alex Highsmith has the current career sack record with 20.0.
Charlotte received votes for the first time in the National Coaches Poll after the win.
2nd game in the series since 2020 (Tied 1–1).

Gardner–Webb

Sources:

The 49ers were looking to build off of the previous week's success by dominating local rival Gardner-Webb Runnin' Bulldogs. Charlotte would find the endzone first and never really looked back as they were able to hold Gardner-Webb to 10 total points of offense. Charlotte's bend-but-don't-break defense allowed GWU to move the ball down the field but was able to frustrate most of the Runnin' Bulldogs' scoring attempts as the 49ers walked away with a 38 to 10 home victory.

Top performances of the game included the 49ers' Chris Reynolds who threw for 103 yards and a touchdown with 2 interceptions. Gardner-Webb's Narii Gaither had 16 carries for 82 yards and a touchdown. The Runnin' Bulldogs' Justin Franklin had 4 receptions for 53 yards.

Game notes:

Chris Reynolds would connect to his favorite receiver of 4 years Victor Tucker on a 28 yard pass in the 3rd quarter to move into 1st place all-time on the 49ers passing yardage board. He'd finish the game with 5,469  career passing yards, moving past previous record holder Matt Johnson's 5,405 yards.
Reynolds is now 2 passing touchdowns away from tying Johnson's career touchdown passes record (42).
Markees Watts' sack in this game moved him past Larry Ogunjobi into second place on the 49ers career sacks list with 13.5 sacks. 
4th game in the series since 2013, (Char. 3–1)

Georgia State

Sources:

Rain and slick conditions would help turn this matchup into a ground and pound event dominated be defense. Charlotte would score first in the second quarter but Georgia State would tie it up moving into halftime.

The second half resulted in Charlotte retaking the lead on an intention grounding safety, but the Panthers would retake the lead before the end of the quarter. The 4th quarter was more of the same running game for both teams but Georgia State was able to find their running game rhythm and would put the game out of reach on a final touchdown with less than two minutes to go in the contest.

Georgia State dominated the top performances with Darren Grainger passing for 139 yards, 2 touchdowns and an interception. Runningback Dustin Coates had 4 carries for 83 yards. Jamari Thrash had 2 receptions for 62 yards and a touchdown.

Game notes:

The 2nd quarter touchdown pass from Chris Reynolds to Elijah Spencer was Reynolds' 41st career pass. He was one touchdown pass away from tying the 49ers career passing TD leader Matt Johnson (42).
Jonathan Cruz broke the record for consecutive PATs, passing Blake Brewer's record of 46.
The 49ers' first visit to Center Parc Stadium. The previous meeting in Atlanta took place in the Georgia Dome.
3rd game in the series since 2015, (GAST 2–1)

Middle Tennessee

Sources:

Charlotte would score first only to have Middle Tennessee tie it up before a go ahead touchdown would again give the 49ers the lead. In the 2nd quarter the Blue Raiders would tie the game up again and take their first lead into halftime off a field goal.

Charlotte and Middle Tennessee would again swap leads in the 3rd quarter with the 49ers up heading into the 4th quarter. The 49ers would stretch their lead to 11 points early in the 4th only to see the Blue Raiders cut the lead down to 3 points after a successful two-point conversion. Charlotte would then tack on another touchdown only to see the Blue Raiders again cut the lead to 3 points with slightly more than 2 minutes left in the game, but Middle Tennessee's on-sides kick attempt would fail and with no time outs left the 49ers were able to take a knee to their 3rd home victory of the season.

Top performers of the game included Middle Tennessee's Chase Cunningham who passed for 379 yards and 5 touchdowns. The 49ers' Chris Reynolds would match Cunningham's touchdown performance with 339 yards of passing with 4 passing touchdowns and a 1 yard rushing touchdown. Charlotte's Calvin Camp had 12 carries for 101 yards and a touchdown. The 49ers' Grant DuBose had 9 receptions for 14 yards and 2 touchdowns.

Game notes:

Chris Reynold's 4 passing touchdowns in the game moved him past Matt Johnson (42) with 45 career touchdown passes making him the new career passing leader.
Reynolds also added a rushing touchdown for 5 total touchdowns in the game.
Reynold's received his 2nd Conference USA Offensive Player of the Week award for the season.
Grant DuBose (114 receiving), Victor Tucker (108 receiving), and Clavin Camp (101 rushing) all had 100 yard performances in the game.
6th game in the series since 2015, (MT 4–2).

Illinois

Sources:

The game got off to a slow start with the Illini making a field goal halfway through the first quarter and Charlotte answering with a touchdown right before the second quarter. The Illini would finally find the endzone with less than three minutes left in the half only to have the 49ers answer with a touchdown of their on to take a 14 to 10 lead into the halftime.

The Illini would retake the lead midway through the third quarter. Charlotte would get into comfortable field goal range in the last seconds of the quarter to attempt to tie the game only to have the ball drift wide right. On the next play from scrimmage the Illini would tack on an 80 yard touchdown run. The Illini would then use ball control running plays to eat up the clock and walk away with a 24 to 14 home victory.

Top performances of the game included Charlotte's Chris Reynolds, who threw for 191 yards, two touchdowns and an interception. The Fighting Illini's Chase Brown had 26 carries for 257 yards and two touchdowns. The 49ers' Grant DuBose had four receptions for 70 yards.

Game notes:

First 49ers game in the State of Illinois.
First game against a Big Ten Conference opponent.
First time the 49ers have played two Power 5 conference teams in a single season.
Chris Reynolds became the first 49ers passer to cross the 6000 yards mark.
Victor Tucker moved into a 2nd place tie with Trent Bostick for career touchdown receptions with 12.
First game in series history.

FIU

Sources:

The game Started slow with Charlotte answering FIU's field goal with a touchdown. The 49ers would pad their lead in the 2nd quarter with another touchdown before both teams traded field goals before the half. Charlotte hit the locker rooms with a 17 to 6 lead.

Charlotte would stretch the lead out to 18 early in the 2nd half, but two plays later FIU would find the endzone for the first time in the game. Charlotte would go back out to an 18 point lead before the start of the last quarter with a 21 to 3 lead.

Both teams would score as many touchdowns in the 4th quarter as they had in the entire rest of the game combined. FIU would pull back to within 11 points early in the quarter. With less than six minutes left on the clock the 49ers again would go out to an 18 point lead on a Jon Alexander interception return, only to have the Panthers score on the very next play. The Panthers looked like they might have recovered the ensuing on-sides kick, but the ball didn't cross the 10 yard mark by mere inches. The 49ers would capitalize on the turnover and again reach the magic number 18 with less than 3 minutes on the clock. FIU would get it to within 12 points with less than 15 seconds on the clock, but the on-sides kick attempt this time was easily recovered by the 49ers who would leave Miami with a 45 to 33 win.

Both quarterbacks, Charlotte's Chris Reynolds and FIU's Matt Bortenschlager, put up four touchdowns passes each, Reynolds for 203 yards and Bortenschlager for an impressive 466 yards and an interception. FIU's D'vonte Price rushed for 89 yards on 18 carries. The Panthers' Tyrese Chambers had 3 receptions for 201 yards and two touchdowns.

Game notes:

First victory for Charlotte over FIU, who was the last team in CUSA's Eastern Division that Charlotte had never defeated.
Shadrick Byrd was named Conference USA Special Teams Player of the Week.
6th game in the series since 2015, (FIU 5–1).

Florida Atlantic

Sources:

Both teams, coming off bye weeks, would start the game slowly with Charlotte parting the uprights in the first quarter and FAU getting the first touchdown near the end of the second quarter. With no time left in the half Charlotte would find the endzone to take a lead into the locker rooms at halftime, but the rare missed PAT from Jonathan Cruz would seem to be a harbinger of what was to come in the second half for the 49ers.

FAU would retake the lead on the first series of the second half and never look back. They would add two more touchdowns before the fourth quarter and pad their lead in the final quarter with a field goal and a final touchdown to win 38 to 9.

Top performers of the game included Florida Atlantic quarterback N'Kosi Perry, who threw for 225 yards and three touchdowns. The Owls' Johnny Ford rushed for 92 yards on 8 carries with a touchdown. Charlotte's Victor Tucker had 6 receptions for 105 yards.

Game notes:

7th game in the series since 2015, (FAU 5–2).

Western Kentucky

Sources:

In a light rain the 49ers struggled behind backup quarterback James Foster to establish an offensive rhythm. This was not an issue WKU had as they scored first in the game and already had 4 touchdowns before the half. Charlotte would split the uprights twice and find the endzone once to keep the game within reach heading into the locker rooms, 28 to 13.

The second half would be significantly less active, but it was all Hilltoppers, adding two more touchdowns and a field goal to put the game safely in their pocket. The final score was WKU 45, Charlotte 13.

Top performances of the game were dominated by the Hilltopper's, whose Bailey Zappe threw for 393 yards, 4 touchdowns and 2 interceptions on his way to collecting a CUSA Offensive Player of the Week Award. Noah Whittingham rushed for 66 yards on 10 carries for a touchdown. Jerreth Sterns had 10 receptions for 89 yards and a touchdown.

Game notes:

Jonathan Cruz's 56 yard field goal tied his own school record.
The 56 yard field goal also matched the season longest NCAA field goal up to that point in the season.
5th game in the series since 2017, (WKU 4–1).

Rice

Sources:

Charlotte scored first on the windy afternoon in the first quarter. Rice would answer early in the 2nd quarter to tie it up but mid-way through that quarter the 49ers would again find the endzone to take a 14 to 7 lead in at the half.

Rice split the uprights midway through the 3rd quarter after the 49ers turned it over in the redzone. Rice would take their first lead of the game late in the third quarter and early in the fourth quarter would extended it to a two score lead. The 49ers again would find the redzone but would be forced to settle for a field goal to get it back down to a one score game. With less than a minute and a half left in regulation Chris Reynolds would find Elijah Spencer in the corner of the endzone to tie the game for the second time. Rice would go 4 and out and Charlotte would take their chances in overtime.

Charlotte took possession first in the overtime and on the first play Reynolds again would find Spencer to take a 7 point lead. On their second play of the overtime Rice's Jake Constantine would be flushed from the pocket and throw up a game winning interception to Charlotte's Luke Martin, securing the overtime win for the 49ers at 31 to 24.

Top performances of the game included Charlotte's Chris Reynolds, who threw for 292 yards and 3 touchdowns. Rice's Ari Broussard had 20 carries for 186 yards and 2 touchdowns. The 49ers' Elijah Spencer had 6 receptions for 77 yards and 2 touchdowns.

Game notes:

49th home game at Richardson Stadium for the 49ers.
49th Conference USA game for the 49ers.
First overtime game for the 49ers since the 2017 season.
3rd game in the series since 2015, (Rice 2–1).

Louisiana Tech

Sources:

In the first ever match between these conference foes the Louisiana Tech Bulldogs, already eliminated from bowl contention, got to play spoiler to the 49ers who were still seeking their second bowl qualification in program history.

The game started slow with the Bulldogs taking the early lead at home, but the 49ers would tie the game up before the Bulldogs would score again to take a 14 to 7 lead into the half.

Once again Charlotte experienced a second half change in pace as the Bulldogs early in the third quarter took a commanding two score lead. The 49ers would gain a field goal and a touchdown in the quarter but La. Tech would also find the end zone again to preserve a two score lead heading into the last quarter of play. Charlotte would add two more touchdowns in the fourth quarter but so would the Bulldogs who would win the battle at home to the score of 42 to 32, denying Charlotte a bowl qualification for at least another week and continuing Charlotte's road winless tour.

Top performances for the game included Charlotte's Chris Reynolds, who threw for 448 yards with 2 touchdowns and an interception. The Bulldogs' Marcus Williams Jr. rushed for 131 yards on 29 carries with 4 touchdowns. The 49ers' Keith Pearson had 6 receptions for 150 yards and 2 touchdowns.

Game notes:

First time the 49ers will visit the State of Louisiana.
First time these two cross-division conference mates will meet.
Chris Reynold's 448 passing yards set a new school single-game record.
Reynold's became the first 49ers' passer to cross 7,000 career passing yards.
Louisiana Tech is the final team in Conference USA the 49ers have yet to play.

Marshall

Sources:

Charlotte would find the endzone first to take the early lead before Marshall would tie the game going into the second quarter. The Herd would take the lead early in the second quarter before the 49ers would again tie the score before a late Marshall touchdown let them take a 21 to 14 lead in at the half.

Charlotte's second half woes would again plague the team as Marshall rattled off three third quarter touchdowns, and their fourth touchdown in a row, before the Niners could answer early in the fourth quarter. The teams would exchange two more touchdowns to end the game behind both teams' second string quarterbacks but the game was effectively over in the third quarter with Marshall winning 49 to 28.

Top performers of the game included Charlotte's Chris Reynolds, who threw for 178 yards with 3 touchdowns and an interception on his way to setting a new program single season touchdown record. Marshall's Rasheen Ali rushed for 203 yards on 23 carries for 3 touchdowns. The Herds' Corey Gammage had 3 receptions for 78 yards and a touchdown

Game notes:

100th game in Charlotte program history.
Chris Reynold's 3 touchdown passes in the game broke his own single season touchdown record (24 vs 22).
6th game in the series since 2015, (Mar. 4–2).

Old Dominion

Sources:

Both teams in this contest need the win to become bowl eligible. Old Dominion had turned a 1-6 start into 5 straight wins. Charlotte had lost 4 of 5 after starting the season 4-2. For these two teams on different wave trajectories, this battle was critical to continue their seasons for a bowl game. 

After the usual slow start for the 49ers the Monarchs rattled off two 1st quarter touchdowns and started the 2nd quarter with another to take an early commanding lead before Charlotte would find the endzone. ODU would score again before Charlotte's Luke Martin would intercept a batted pass and return it for the 49ers' second score of the game. The Monarchs took a 28 and 14 lead in at the half. 

The start of the 2nd half would be Charlotte's turn to score as tow touchdowns in the 3rd quarter tied the game up at 28-all before ODU would tack on a touchdown to retake the lead heading into the final quarter of regulation. Charlotte would get into ODU's half of the field twice early in the 4th quarter but would have to settle for twin Jonathan Cruz field goals to make it a 1 point game, but with less than 7 minutes left in the game ODU would score two offensive touchdowns and return a 49ers' fumble for a third touchdown to win the game 56 to 34.

Old Dominion dominated the top performances of the game with Hayden Wolff throwing fir 328 yards, 3 touchdowns and 2 interceptions. Blake Watson rushed for 106 yards on 18 carries for 2 touchdowns. Ali Jennings III had 9 receptions for 252 yards and 3 touchdowns.

Game notes:

Charlotte's first time visiting the newly rebuilt S.B. Ballard Stadium.
Charlotte's 2nd Oyster Bowl, the series is tied 1-1.
Chris Reynolds set a new single season passing record for the 49ers with 2,684 yards.
6th game in the series since 2015, (ODU 4–2).

Attendance

References

Charlotte
Charlotte 49ers football seasons
Charlotte 49ers football